Terry R. Spence (born November 30, 1941) is an American politician from New Castle, Delaware. He is a member of the Republican Party, who served in the Delaware General Assembly and as Speaker of the Delaware House of Representatives. He was defeated in the 2008 election by Democrat Michael A. Barbieri and lost an attempt to regain his seat in 2010. Though a social conservative, Spence's representation of his middle class and union voters in his district often put him at odds with other Republican Party leaders. He qualified and received votes for the Working Families Party in 2008 and 2010 in addition to the Republican Party.

Early life and career
Spence was born in Wilmington, Delaware and grew up in New Castle. His father, Ernest Spence Jr., was a state trooper who had run for the 6th district seat on the New Castle County Council in 1972.

Spence received an associate degree in business from Goldey–Beacom College and later a bachelor's degree from Wilmington College. He served in the Delaware Air National Guard and later became a state trooper with the Delaware State Police like his father.

Political career
Upon the retirement of four-term Democratic state representative John P. Ferguson in 1980, Spence ran as a Republican for Ferguson's seat in the 20th representative district. Despite the district's Democratic leaning, the nationwide Republican tide led by presidential candidate Ronald Reagan helped propel Spence to a six-point victory over Democrat John Zimath. In 1982, redistricting caused by the United States Census changed his district number from 20 to 18. He was reelected to the House over Democrat Ronald Queen with 63 percent of the vote. He was unopposed in seven of his thirteen reelection campaigns and often won reelection with large margins.

In 2006, Spence faced a tough reelection due to the increasing percentage of Democrats in his district, with 49 percent of voters registered as Democrats and only 26% registered as Republicans, and with the unpopularity of Republican president George W. Bush. Spence was viewed as vulnerable by the Democratic Party of Delaware, who recruited Michael Barbieri to run against him. It was his closest race since he initially won election in 1980, but he still defeated Barbieri by over 12 points. Barbieri challenged him again in the 2008 election. This time, owing to long coattails from the presidential race (with Senator Joe Biden as Barack Obama's running mate), Barbieri winning the election by six points. Spence sought a rematch in 2010 and lost by 13 points.

Speaker of the House
In 1987, the Republicans in the Delaware House elected B. Bradford Barnes from Bridgeville as Speaker of the House. However, Barnes died in office shortly thereafter, and Spence, who was elected in the same year as Barnes, was then chosen to succeed him as Speaker. He served as speaker until he lost his reelection in 2008, eventually becoming the longest serving Speaker of the House in the history of the Delaware General Assembly. He has also held the position of Speaker longer than any other Speaker of a state legislature in the history of the United States.

In 2006, Spence and Majority Leader Wayne Smith were opposed for their leadership positions in the Republican Caucus by Joseph W. Booth and Richard C. Cathcart, respectively. However, Republicans retained their majority in the Delaware House and lost only two seats in the 2006 elections that saw large Republican losses throughout the country. House Republicans voted to keep the leadership that had led them through the tumultuous election. After being reelected Speaker, Spence appointed Booth and Cathcartto the powerful appropriations and joint finance committees.

2000 gubernatorial race

In 1991 and 1995, Spence explored the possibility of running for governor, but in both cases decided not to challenge popular Democrat Tom Carper. In 2000, however, he decided to run and entered the Republican gubernatorial primary. Unfortunately, his past record of support for labor worked against him as the support of the party's hierarchy and the state's business leaders quickly coalesced around chairman of the state Chamber of Commerce and former state house majority leader John M. Burris. Due to an inability to raise campaign funds, Spence withdrew from the race before the September primary election in order to run for reelection to the House and endorsed Burris, the eventual Republican nominee who went on to lose the general election to then Lieutenant Governor Ruth Ann Minner.

Electoral history

Terms in public office

Personal life
Spence and his wife, Nancy, have four children—Terry, Greg, Mark, and Laura. His sons Greg and Mark also became Delaware State Troopers.

References

|-

|-

1941 births
Living people
Speakers of the Delaware House of Representatives
Republican Party members of the Delaware House of Representatives
American state police officers
Goldey–Beacom College alumni
Wilmington University alumni
People from Wilmington, Delaware
People from New Castle, Delaware